Versicolor may refer to:

 Brugmansia versicolor, a near threatened species
 Calotes versicolor, an agamid lizard
 Cyphoma versicolor, a species of sea snail
 Eleutherodactylus versicolor, a species of frog found in Ecuador and Peru
 Hyla versicolor, a species of frog found in North America
 Ipomoea versicolor, an ornamental plant
 Iris versicolor, a medicinal plant
 Meriania versicolor, a species of plant endemic to Colombia
 Panulirus versicolor, a species of spiny lobster
 Pestalotiopsis versicolor, a plant pathogen
 Phrynobatrachus versicolor, a species of frog found in Burundi, Democratic Republic of the Congo, Rwanda, and Uganda
 Sphaeradenia versicolor, a species of plant endemic to Ecuador
 Symplocos versicolor, a critically endangered species
 Tinea versicolor, a common skin infection
 Trametes versicolor, a common polypore mushroom